The Women's Long Jump event at the 2005 World Championships in Athletics was held at the Helsinki Olympic Stadium on August 9 and August 10.

Medalists

Records

Qualification

Heat 1
  Concepción Montaner, Spain 6.65m Q
  Yargelis Savigne, Cuba 6.57m q
  Kelly Sotherton, Great Britain 6.55m q
  Elva Goulbourne, Jamaica 6.53m q
  Rose Richmond, United States 6.53m
  Fiona May, Italy 6.51m
  Marestella Torres, Philippines 6.46m
  Naide Gomes, Portugal 6.42m
  Natalia Kilpeläinen, Finland 6.34m
  Ineta Radēviča, Latvia 6.34m
  Soko Salaqiqi, Fiji 5.77m (PB)
  Martina Darmovzalová, Czech Republic 5.74m
 Tatyana Kotova, Russia DQ 6.63 m
 Kene Ndoye, Senegal DNS

Heat 2
  Tianna Madison, United States 6.83m Q (PB)
  Tünde Vaszi, Hungary 6.62m q
  Eunice Barber, France 6.60m q
  Grace Upshaw, United States 6.59m q
  Oksana Udmurtova, Russia 6.56m q
  Anju Bobby George, India 6.54m q (SB)
  Jackie Edwards, Bahamas 6.53m q
  Kumiko Ikeda, Japan 6.51m
  Oleksandra Shyshlyuk, Ukraine 6.35m
  Bianca Kappler, Germany 6.35m
  Ioanna Kafetzi, Greece 6.31m
  Adina Anton, Romania 6.25m
 Irina Simagina, Russia DNS

Final
  Tianna Madison, United States 6.89m (PB)
  Eunice Barber, France 6.76m
  Yargelis Savigne, Cuba 6.69m
  Anju Bobby George, India 6.66m (SB)
  Oksana Udmurtova, Russia 6.53m
  Grace Upshaw, United States 6.51m
  Kelly Sotherton, Great Britain 6.42m
  Jackie Edwards, Bahamas 6.42m
  Tünde Vaszi, Hungary 6.32m
  Concepción Montaner, Spain 6.32m
  Elva Goulbourne, Jamaica 6.21m
  Tatyana Kotova, Russia DQ 6.79 m

External links
IAAF results, heats
IAAF results, final

Long jump
Long jump at the World Athletics Championships
2005 in women's athletics